Shopping Hero, also known as , is a Japanese comedic television drama. Eleven episodes were created and broadcast on TV Asahi, from July 5, 2002, to September 20, 2002.

Plot
The show centers around Makoto, a mild-mannered businessman who works for Paradise Corporation. Makoto is unable to confess his true feelings to his coworker, Yuka. She works as the queen of shopping on Paradise Corporation's show and is late for broadcasting. To save the show, Makoto appears as Shopping Hero and thus a legend is born. His performance is a great success, he's forced to do this weekly and his identity remains hidden amongst his peers. During his product presentation, he is able to pitch his product and teach a life lesson to his audience.

Cast
Shunsuke Nakamura
Ayako Kawahara
Kenji Kohashi
Hiromasa Taguchi
Masao Kusakari
Sawa Suzuki
Hiroshi Tamaki

Japanese drama television series